Schoenherr is a corporate law firm with 14 offices and 4 country desks in Central and Eastern Europe. Around 300 lawyers advise on national and international commercial mandates. The law firm is focused on transactions, as well as competition, regulatory, intellectual property matters and other areas of business law. Schoenherr is headquartered at Schottenring 19, 1010 Vienna, Austria.

History 
Founded as a small Austrian law firm by the lawyer and university professor Fritz Schönherr in 1950, Schoenherr was one of the first international firms to enter the Central Eastern and Southeastern European (CEE/SEE) market in the 1990s. Schoenherr started to expand its operations into CEE by opening an office in Romania in 1996. After that, Schoenherr moved into other jurisdictions and opened offices in Bulgaria (2004), Hungary (2008), Czech Republic (2009), Poland (2009), Slovakia (2009), Moldova (2009), Turkey (2013), and Montenegro (2016). Furthermore, the law firm has country desks for Albania, Bosnia & Herzegovina, Macedonia, and Ukraine. In the early 2000s, Schoenherr established co-operation partnerships in Croatia, Slovenia, and Serbia as well.

Awards 
Schoenherr often wins awards for its work in the region by industry journals such as Chambers Europe, IFLR 1000, JUVE Verlag für juristische Information, Acuris (former "Mergermarket Ltd.") or The Lawyer for leading legal advisory. Recently, Schoenherr won the "2017 Deal of the Year" award in Austria by CEE Legal Matters for advising on the merger between Raiffeisen Bank International and Raiffeisenbank Zentralbank Österreich. Other awards the law firm has won are "Austria M&A Legal Adviser of the Year" (2017) at the Mergermarket European Awards, "Austrian Law Firm of the Year" (2017) by IFLR, "European Restructuring Deal: HETA" (2017) by IFLR, "The International Arbitration Practice that Impressed the Most in the Past Year" (2016) by GAR, "IP Law Firm of the Year - Austria" (2017) by Managing IP, "Romanian Law Firm of the Year" and "Austrian Law Firm of the Year" (2016) by Chambers and Partners, "Eastern Europe and the Balkans Law Firm of the Year" (2016) by The Lawyer, "South Eastern Europe Law Firm of the Year" (2015, 2008) at the Chambers Europe Awards for Excellence.

Publications 
Since 2007, Schoenherr has been publishing an annual legal publication "The Schoenherr Roadmap" which includes articles on legislative changes across Austria, CEE, and Turkey. The publication also includes artwork put together in cooperation with different artists, like Esther Stocker (2007), Mario Dalpra (2010), Leo Zogmayer (2015) and Manfred Makra (2018). 

In 2016 Schoenherr released an online legal comparison tool called the "Schoenherr Knowledge Portal." There, the law firm addresses legal topics such as direct lending, and ICOs comparing the laws across the region.

Several Schoenherr lawyers are part of the editorial teams of legal journals, like ÖBl and ecolex. They have (co-)authored commentaries, studies and reports on IP and trademark law, cross-border mergers, NPLs, real estate and employment law matters across CEE. 

Schoenherr lawyers are also authors of articles on CEE legislation for legal publishers such as International Law Office, Wolters Kluwer, International Comparative Legal Guides ("ICLG"), Lexology, Mondaq, The Lawyer, CEE Legal Matters, Getting the Deal Through, Thomson Reuters, and The Law Reviews.

External links 
 Schönherr

Law firms with offices in foreign countries